This is a list of members of the Western Australian Legislative Council between 22 May 1993 and 21 May 1997:

Notes
 On 26 April 1994, North Metropolitan Liberal MLC Bob Pike died. Liberal candidate Iain MacLean was elected in the resultant countback on 31 May 1994.
 On 28 February 1995, East Metropolitan Labor MLC Tom Butler resigned. Labor candidate Valma Ferguson was elected in the resultant countback on 4 April 1995.
 In April 1996, North Metropolitan MLC Sam Piantadosi left the Labor Party and sat as an independent. He resigned on 19 November 1996 to contest the seat of Yokine at the 1996 election. Labor candidate Ed Dermer, who had already won the seat effective from May 1997 at the aforementioned election, was elected at the resulted countback on 24 December 1996.
 On 19 November 1996, North Metropolitan Liberal MLC Iain MacLean resigned to contest the seat of Wanneroo at the 1996 election. Liberal candidate Alan Carstairs was elected to the subsequent vacancy in a countback on 24 December 1996.
 On 21 November 1996, East Metropolitan Labor MLC Alannah MacTiernan resigned to contest the seat of Armadale at the 1996 election. Labor member Paul Sulc was elected to the subsequent vacancy in a countback on 24 December 1996.

Members of Western Australian parliaments by term